Ganisi was a village in the Kazbegi Municipality in Mtskheta-Mtianeti, Georgia. It is placed on the right bank of the Aragvi river in Gud Valley. According to 2014 census, it had no living inhabitants.
In the year 1926 it had 86 inhabitants, most of them were ethnic Ossetian.

Ganisi was a birthplace of the Ossetian national writer Seka Gadiyev.

References

Mtskheta-Mtianeti